Hopantenic acid (homopantothenic acid), also known as N-pantoyl-GABA, is a central nervous system depressant.  Formulated as the calcium salt, it is used as a pharmaceutical drug in the Russian Federation for a variety of neurological, psychological and psychiatric conditions and sold as Pantogam.  It is not approved for use in Europe or the United States. In Japan, approval for HOPATE (Calcium hopantenate) was withdrawn in 1989 due to an outbreak of Reye's syndrome.

Chemistry
Hopantenic acid is a homologue of pantothenic acid. While pantothenic acid is the amide of D-pantoate and β-alanine, hopantenic acid is the amide of D-pantoate and γ-aminobutyric acid (GABA). This change leads to an additional CH2 in the molecule.

See also
 Methyl pentanoate
 Menthyl isovalerate

References

External links
 pantogab (hopantenic acid) - Curehunter.com

Drugs acting on the nervous system
GABA analogues